The Libertine is a 2004 period drama film, the first film directed by Laurence Dunmore. It was adapted by Stephen Jeffreys from his play of the same name, and stars Johnny Depp and Samantha Morton as John Wilmot, 2nd Earl of Rochester and Elizabeth Barry, with John Malkovich, Rosamund Pike, Rupert Friend and Kelly Reilly in supporting roles. Set in 1675 England, the film chronicles the life of John Wilmot, 2nd Earl of Rochester, who is asked by King Charles II to write a play celebrating his reign, while simultaneously training Elizabeth Barry to improve her acting.

The film was shot on location on the Isle of Man and Wales. The setting for Rochester's home of Adderbury house was filmed on location at Montacute House, Montacute, Somerset and Charlecote Park, Warwickshire.

Plot 
In 1675, John Wilmot, Second Earl of Rochester, delivers a prologue of themes of his fondness for drink, his sexual proclivities, and his disdain for his audience.

King Charles II retracts his banishment of the earl as he has need of him in the House of Lords. Back in London, Rochester finds his "Merry Gang" friends, George Etherege and Charles Sackville, in a bawdy house. Rochester encounters on the street the thief Alcock. Impressed by his dishonesty, Rochester hires him as his gentleman. The Merry Gang introduce Rochester to its newest member, 18-year-old Billy Downs. Rochester warns Downs, "Young man, you will die of this company."

The Merry Gang attend a play where the actress Elizabeth Barry is booed off the stage, refusing to participate in a curtain call, and is fired. Rochester is taken with Barry, secures her re-employment with the theatre company, and undertakes to coach her in acting. Barry's acting improves dramatically and she delivers a brilliant performance in her next production. The King approaches Barry to spy on Rochester as to the progress of the intended tribute to the French Ambassador.

Charles, in need of money from France, asks Rochester to write a play in honour of the French Ambassador's visit. The king requests it be a "monument" to his reign. Rochester writes Sodom, or the Quintessence of Debauchery, a scathing satire of the king's reign, which he claims is "a monument to Charles" — just what the king had asked for. The play involves vulgar language, simulated sex acts, and Rochester portraying the king being serviced. At the premiere, the king interrupts the play and on the stage and confronts Rochester. Downs is mortally wounded in a sword fight outside the home of a Constable; Rochester backs away from his dying friend, whispering, "I told you."

Hiding from the king in the English countryside and sick with symptoms of syphilis, Rochester peddles phoney gynaecological "treatments" for women, including the selling of "potions" made from Alcock's urine. Rochester's face has become disfigured by syphilitic gummata, which he hides beneath a mask. Charles eventually tracks down Rochester, but decides that the worst punishment possible is to simply "let you be you." Rochester returns to his estate and wife, Elizabeth, admitting to having been constantly for five years under the influence of "the drink." Elizabeth declares her love for him.

Charles' choice of heir, his Roman Catholic brother James, Duke of York, leads to a showdown in Parliament over the Exclusion Bill that would deny James the throne. Rochester uses make-up and a silver nose tip to hide the indications of syphilis as he enters the House of Lords hobbling on two canes. His denunciation in the Lords of the bill ingratiates the appreciation of the king when it is defeated. When Rochester reveals his desire to have wanted Barry as his wife she reveals she never had the desire to be the wife of anyone, she had a daughter by him that he was unaware of, and this daughter is called Elizabeth.

Rochester returns to his estate where he is bedridden in the care of Elizabet and his mother. A priest is summoned to "bring God to him" as his mother did not want Rochester to die as an atheist, and Alcock. Before he dies, Rochester asks the priest to recite from Book of Isaiah, chapter 53; he also asks his wife to retell the story of how he had abducted her when she was 18 years old and they fell in love. Rochester's death is followed by a scene of Elizabeth Barry playing the role of his wife in The Man of Mode, the play about him written by his friend Etherege.

The epilogue depicts Rochester slipping into the darkness of an increasingly fading candlelight, asking "Do you like me now?"

Cast

Music 

The score to the film was composed by Michael Nyman, and released as The Libertine: Music for the Film by Laurence Dunmore in November 2005.  The music represents Nyman's last score for a major motion picture to date, and his last soundtrack release.

Reception

Critical response 
The film received mixed to negative reviews from critics. The site's critical consensus reads, "Despite Johnny Depp's zealous performance, muddled direction and murky cinematography hinder The Libertine." Metacritic calculated an average score of 44 out of 100 based on 30 reviews, indicating "mixed or average reviews". Roger Ebert of the Chicago Sun-Times gave the film 3 stars out of 4 praising Johnny Depp's performance, stating "Libertines are not built for third acts. No self-respecting libertine lives that long. Johnny Depp finds sadness in the earl's descent, and a desire to be loved even as he makes himself unlovable. What a brave actor Depp is, to take on a role like this. Still, at the screenplay stage, 'The Libertine' might have seemed a safer bet than Pirates of the Caribbean, a movie [which] studio executives reportedly thought was unreleasable."

Box office 
The film has grossed $4,835,065 in North America and $6,016,999 in other territories, for a total of $10,852,064 worldwide.

Awards and honours 
The Libertine was nominated in eight categories in the British Independent Film Awards for 2005, and won in one category, gaining a Best Performance by a Supporting Actor or Actress in a British Independent Film award for Rosamund Pike. The other nominations were:

Best British Independent Film
Best Performance by a Supporting Actor or Actress in a British Independent Film (Tom Hollander)
Best Technical Achievement (Ben van Os)
The Douglas Hickox Award (Laurence Dunmore)
Best Director of a British Independent Film (Laurence Dunmore)
Best Performance by an Actor in a British Independent Film (Johnny Depp)
Most Promising Newcomer (Rupert Friend)

Home media 
The Libertine is available on DVD as of 2004.

References

External links 

 
 
 
 The Libertine Press Notes

2004 films
2000s historical drama films
British historical drama films
British biographical drama films
2004 biographical drama films
British films based on plays
Films set in the 1670s
Films set in the 1680s
Films shot in Wales
Films set in England
Films set in London
Mr. Mudd films
Films scored by Michael Nyman
2004 directorial debut films
Australian biographical drama films
Australian historical drama films
2004 drama films
2006 drama films
2006 films
Cultural depictions of Charles II of England
2000s English-language films
2000s British films